300 m rifle prone (formerly known as one of four free rifle disciplines) is an ISSF shooting event. It was added to the World Championship program in 1982, and was based on the English Match but shot with the same full-power rifle as in 300 metre rifle three positions. The course of fire, like in the small-bore 50 metre rifle prone, is 60 shots for both men and women.

300 m rifle has been a declining event for many decades because of the considerable cost for competing in the event and the difficulty of creating ranges for it. 300 metre Rifle is still on the World and regional championships program, though.

World Championships, Men

World Championships, Men Team

World Championships, Women

World Championships, Women Team

World Championships, total medals

Current world records

See also
 European Shooting Confederation
 International Shooting Sport Federation
 ISSF shooting events
 1959 European 300 m Rifle Championships

References

External links
 

ISSF shooting events
Rifle shooting sports

no:300 m rifle